Homeobox protein SIX2 is a protein that in humans is encoded by the SIX2 gene.

References

Further reading

Transcription factors